Ederaldo Antonio de Oliveira (born 17 October 1981), simply known as Oliveira, is a Brazilian footballer who plays as a goalkeeper for São Bernardo.

References

External links

1981 births
Living people
Brazilian footballers
Association football goalkeepers
Campeonato Brasileiro Série B players
Campeonato Brasileiro Série D players
Grêmio Barueri Futebol players
Roma Esporte Apucarana players
Esporte Clube Internacional players
Foz do Iguaçu Futebol Clube players
Esporte Clube São Luiz players
Esporte Clube Pelotas players
Clube Atlético Linense players
Cianorte Futebol Clube players
São Carlos Futebol Clube players
Joinville Esporte Clube players
Grêmio Esportivo Novorizontino players
Ituano FC players
Esporte Clube Juventude players